The eighteenth series of Geordie Shore, a British television programme based in Newcastle Upon Tyne was filmed in July 2018 and began airing on 16 October 2018. It concluded after ten episodes on 18 December 2018. This was the first series to include new cast member Faith Mullen. Ahead of the series it was announced that former cast member Scott Timlin would be making a return to the show. It was also announced that former cast members James Tindale, Kyle Christie and Alex MacPherson would all be making guest appearances throughout the series.

Cast 
 Chloe Ferry
 Holly Hagan
 Sam Gowland
 Adam Guthrie
 Nathan Henry
 Abbie Holborn
Sophie Kasaei
 Alex MacPherson
 Faith Mullen
 Scott Timlin

Duration of cast

 = Cast member is featured in this episode.
 = Cast member arrives in the house.
 = Cast member leaves and returns to the house in the same episode.
 = Cast member returns to the house.
 = Cast member leaves the series.
 = Cast member returns to the series.
 = Cast member features in this episode, but is outside of the house.
 = Cast member does not feature in this episode.
 = Cast member is not officially a cast member in this episode.

Episodes

Ratings

References

Series 18
2018 British television seasons